The 2008 Canada rugby union tour of Europe was a series of matches played in November 2008 in Europe by Canada national rugby union team. Canadian won only the first match against Portugal, and lost the other three.

Results

Portugal

Ireland

Wales

Scotland 

Canada
tour
Canada national rugby union team tours
tour
tour
tour
Rugby union tours of Portugal
Rugby union tours of Ireland
Rugby union tours of Wales
Rugby union tours of Scotland